The Federation of Norwegian Industries is an employers' organisation in Norway, organized under the national Confederation of Norwegian Enterprise.

It was established on 1 January 2006 as a merger of the Federation of Norwegian Manufacturing Industries and the Federation of Norwegian Process Industries.

The current CEO is Stein Lier-Hansen. Chairman of the board is Rasmus Sunde.

References

Employers' organisations in Norway
2006 establishments in Norway